Maharishi Panini Sanskrit Evam Vedic Vishwavidyalaya (MPSVV), formerly Maharshi Panini Sanskrit University or Maharishi Panini Sanskrit Vishwavidyalaya, is a state university situated in Ujjain, Madhya Pradesh, India. It was established in 2008 by the Government of Madhya Pradesh. It was renamed to its current name in 2010.

See also
 Sanskrit revival
 Sanskrit education

References

External links 
 

Universities in Madhya Pradesh
Educational institutions established in 2008
2008 establishments in Madhya Pradesh
Sanskrit universities in India
Buildings and structures in Ujjain
Education in Ujjain